Lukas Strobel (born 28 September 1989), better known by his stage name Alligatoah, is a German rapper, singer, producer and DJ signed to the independent German hip hop record label Trailerpark. He also publishes music for his two fictional characters Kaliba 69 (rapper) and DJ Deagle (producer) under his stage name. His albums Triebwerke and Musik ist keine Lösung were certified gold while the single "Willst du" was certified platinum.

Biography 
Lukas Strobel grew up in Neuenwalde, a town near Bremerhaven in Lower Saxony. During his time at school he produced a number of short films and attended a film festival where he won 750 Euros for one of his films. Strobel continues to produce his videos. On April 10, 2006 Strobel founded the band Alligatoah and created two alter egos, to separate his function as a rapper (Kaliba 69) and as a producer (DJ Deagle). According to Strobel himself, another reason for the creation of the two characters is that he does not always "want to be alone" when making music. The greatest influence for his music was German battle rap like Aggro Berlin. In 2006 he released his first album ATTNTAAT and a mixtape called Schlaftabletten, Rotwein Teil I. Both albums, along with his music film Goldfieber, were downloadable for free. In 2007 he published the mixtape Schlaftabletten, Rotwein Teil II. In March 2008 he signed a contract with the German hip hop label rappers.in. Under this label he released the album In Gottes Namen, which was awarded the best demo of the month in the January/February issue of the German hip hop magazine Juice. For this issue Alligatoah produced an exclusive track. After successfully graduating from high school, Strobel moved to Berlin. In 2011 he released the third part of his mixtape named Schlaftabletten, Rotwein Teil III. In August of the same year he left rappers.in and joined the label Trailerpark after Timi Hendrix, a member of this label, recommended Alligatoah. From September 2011 until March 2012 he attended together with Pimpulsiv, Sudden and DNP the PeppNoseDay Tour in Germany.

In August 2013 Alligatoah released his third album Triebwerke, which debuted at number 1 on the German albums chart. The album received a gold certification in 2014 and the single "Willst du" reached platinum status. In September 2014 a remix of the song "Willst du" by the German DJ Robin Schulz was released and charted on the German iTunes singles chart just a few hours after its release. On 31 August 2015, Alligatoah announced his fourth album Musik ist keine Lösung, which was released on 27 November. On December 3, Strobel won the award "1Live Krone 2015" for the best hip-hop act. In February 2016, Alligatoah embarked on his Himmelfahrtskommando tour and played in 11 German cities, as well as in Graz and Vienna. On April 5 his album Musik ist keine Lösung was certified gold.

Discography

Albums

Mixtapes 
 Schlaftabletten, Rotwein Teil I (2006)
 Schlaftabletten, Rotwein Teil II (2007)
 Schlaftabletten, Rotwein Teil III (2011)
 Schlaftabletten, Rotwein Teil IV (Collective works from 2008 to 2011)

EPs 
 Goldfieber (Soundtracks) (2007)
 Raubkopierah (2008)
 Narben (2014)
 Nicht wecken (2019)

Singles

Other charted songs

Filmography 
 Goldfieber (2007)

Awards and certifications

 2015: German 1 Live Krone in the category Best Hip-Hop Act for the single "Vor Gericht"

Gold certification in Germany 
 2014: For the single "Willst du"
 2014: For the album "Triebwerke"
 2016: For the album "Musik ist keine Lösung"
Platinum certification in Germany 
 2015: For the single "Willst du"

References

External links

 Official website
 Alligatoah biography at Laut.de
 
 
 

1989 births
Living people
German rappers
German record producers
German DJs
Electronic dance music DJs